12AT7 (also known in Europe by the Mullard–Philips tube designation of ECC81) is a miniature 9-pin medium-gain (60) dual-triode vacuum tube popular in guitar amplifiers.  It belongs to a large family of dual triode vacuum tubes which share the same pinout (EIA 9A), including in particular the very commonly used low-mu 12AU7 and high-mu 12AX7.

The 12AT7 has somewhat lower voltage gain than the 12AX7, but higher transconductance and plate current, which makes it suitable for high frequency applications.

Originally the tube was intended for operation in VHF circuits, such as TV sets and FM tuners, as an oscillator/frequency converter, but it also found wide use in audio as a driver and phase-inverter in vacuum tube push–pull amplifier circuits.

This tube is essentially two 6AB4/EC92s in a single envelope. Unlike the situation with the 6C4 and 12AU7, both the 6AB4 and the 12AT7 are described by manufacturer's data sheets as R.F. devices operating up to VHF frequencies.

The tube has a center-tapped filament so it can be used in either 6.3V 300mA or 12.6V 150mA heater circuits.

 the 12AT7 was manufactured in Russia (Electro-Harmonix brand), Slovakia (JJ Electronic), and China.

See also
 12AU7
 12AX7 - includes a comparison of similar twin-triode designs
 List of vacuum tubes

References

External links
 12AT7 twin triode data sheet from General Electric
 Reviews of 12at7 tubes.

Vacuum tubes
Guitar amplification tubes